The University of Massachusetts Amherst College of Social and Behavioral Sciences is a school at the University of Massachusetts Amherst.

References

External links 
 College of Social and Behavioral Sciences official site

University of Massachusetts Amherst schools
University subdivisions in Massachusetts